Citibank Uganda, is a commercial bank in Uganda operating as a wholly owned subsidiary of New York-based Citigroup. It is one of the regulated banking institutions licensed by the Bank of Uganda, the national banking regulator.

Overview
The bank is a medium-sized international bank that focuses on meeting the banking needs of large corporate customers as well as of those individuals with high net worth. , the bank's total asset valuation was approximately USh990 (US$262 million). As of 31 December 2015, shareholders' equity was about USh:155 billion (US$63.5 million).

The bank is an active participant in the promotion of financial literacy in Uganda, especially in the country's schools.

See also
 List of banks in Uganda
 Banking in Uganda
 Economy of Uganda

References

External links
  Website of the Bank of Uganda
 Citibank Uganda Celebrates Tenth Anniversary - 11 November 2009

Citigroup
Banks of Uganda
Banks established in 1999
1999 establishments in Uganda
Companies based in Kampala